Climates were a British melodic hardcore band formed in 2011 in Lincoln, England, by Wesley Thompson, Sam Bowden, Fil Thorpe Evans, Harley Clifton and Henry Othen. However Evans departed in early 2013 to join Neck Deep full-time and Clifton and Othen both departed in 2012. The firing of Thompson in 2014 lead to the bands eventual break up (from which Bowden, Powels, Pritchard and Dawson recruited Kaya Tarsus forming Blood Youth).

Discography

Singles

Members

Final line-up
Wesley Thompson - lead vocals (2011-2014)
Sam Bowden - guitar (2011-2014)
Max Dawson - guitar (2013-2014) bass (2013)
Chris Pritchard - bass (2013; 2014)
Matt Powels - drums (2012-2014)

Past members
Fil Thorpe Evans - guitar (2011-2012)
Josh Geeson - guitar (2013)
Harley Clifton - bass (2011-2012)
Henry Othen - drums (2011-2012)

Timeline

Musical style
Climates' musical style has been described as melodic hardcore, hardcore punk, heavy metal and post-hardcore

References

Melodic hardcore groups
British hardcore punk groups
Musical groups established in 2011
2011 establishments in England